Franco Carpio Guerrero (born 4 February 1946) is a Peruvian engineer and politician, who is a former Congressman, elected in the 2006 elections to represent the Lambayeque region for the 2006–2011 term under the National Unity list. Carpio belongs to the Christian People's Party. Carpio unsuccessfully ran for re-election in the 2011 elections, when he ran for re-election under the Alliance for the Great Change of Pedro Pablo Kuczynski in which the Christian Democrats has integrated, but he received a minority of votes and was not returned to Congress. He subsequently retired from politics.

External links

Official Congressional Site

Living people
National Unity (Peru) politicians
Members of the Congress of the Republic of Peru

1946 births
People from Lambayeque Region
20th-century Peruvian engineers